Miguel Ángel Reyes-Varela and Fernando Romboli were the defending champions but chose not to defend their title.

Nicolás Barrientos and Sergio Galdós won the title by walkover after Antonio Cayetano March and Thiago Agustín Tirante withdrew before the final.

Seeds

Draw

References

External links
 Main draw

Salinas Challenger II - Doubles